is a railway station in the town of Mihama, Mikata District, Fukui Prefecture, Japan, operated by West Japan Railway Company (JR West).

Lines

Station layout
The station consists of one side platform serving a single bi-directional track. There is no station building, but only a shelter on the platform. The station is unattended.

History
Higashi-Mihama Station opened on 1 August 1961.  With the privatization of Japanese National Railways (JNR) on 1 April 1987, the station came under the control of JR West.

Passenger statistics
In fiscal 2016, the station was used by an average of 34 passengers daily (boarding passengers only).

Surrounding area
Mihama-Higashi Elementary School

See also
 List of railway stations in Japan

References

External links

  

Railway stations in Fukui Prefecture
Stations of West Japan Railway Company
Railway stations in Japan opened in 1961
Obama Line
Mihama, Fukui